Persoonia inconspicua is a species of flowering plant in the family Proteaceae and is endemic to the south-west of Western Australia. It is an erect, often spreading shrub with branchlets and leaves that are densely hairy when young, linear leaves and relatively small greenish yellow flowers usually borne singly or in pairs.

Description
Flowering occurs from June to September and the fruit is a smooth drupe.

Taxonomy
Persoonia inconspicua was first formally described in 1994 by Peter Weston in the journal Telopea from specimens collected by Paul Wilson north of Bullfinch in 1970.

Distribution and habitat
This geebung usually grows in heath and woodland Cowcowing Lakes, Mt Jackson, Queen Victoria Rock and the Johnston Lakes, in the Avon Wheatbelt, Coolgardie and Mallee biogeographic regions.

Conservation status
This species is classified as "not threatened" by the Western Australian Government Department of Parks and Wildlife.

References

Flora of Western Australia
inconspicua
Plants described in 1994
Taxa named by Peter H. Weston